The siege of Burriana was one of the battles that occurred during the Conquest of Valencia by James I of Aragon. Burriana was an important Muslim city, being the capital of La Plana, Valencia. It was known as the "Green City". The city was besieged for two months, finally falling to the forces of James I in July 1233.

Context 
In 1229, the city of Valencia, known to the Muslims as "Balansiya", had fallen to the forces under the command of Zayyan ibn Mardanish, a local leader who was opposed to the Almohades. In capturing that city, he dethroned Zayd Abu Zayd, who subsequently fled to the Kingdom of Aragon. James I of Aragon used this as a casus belli to intervene in the Muslim civil war on the side of the Almohades, but in reality with the pretext of expanding his own territory.

Two Aragonese knights, Hugo de Follalquer, Grand Master of the Knights Hospitaller, and Blas de Aragón, who had just returned from a period of exile in Valencia, met with Jaime I at Alcañiz. They recounted stories of the prosperity of the Muslim kingdom and encouraged the king to conquer it in 1233.

Consequences 
After taking Burriana, the castles to the north continued to fall into Aragonese hands one by one including; Peniscola, Castelló de la Plana, Borriol, les Coves de Vinromà and Vilafamés. Three years later, the decisive Battle of the Puig sealed the conquest in 1236.

See also 
 Reconquista

References 
 The information on this page was translated from its Spanish equivalent.

Bibliography 

1233 in Europe
Burriana
Burriana
Burriana
Burriana
13th century in Aragon
Burriana
Burriana
13th century in Al-Andalus
Burriana